Jakob III. Fugger (30 March 1542, in Babenhausen, Bavaria – 7 February 1598, in Babenhausen, Bavaria) was a German businessman and landowner of the Fugger family. He was also Lord of Schloss Babenhausen in Unterallgäu.

Life
He was the fourth son of Anton Fugger and Anna von Rehlingen. On their father's death in 1560 he and his brothers jointly managed the family's company and lands, which were both now of considerable size. In 1573 all the lands were divided between the brothers, with Jakob gaining the lordships of Babenhausen, Wellenburg and Boos among others. In 1583 he and his brothers were granted Reichsstandschaft in the Schwäbischen Reichsgrafenkollegium and the status of count in the Swabian Reichskreis.

Marriage and issue
In 1570 Jakob married Anna Ilsung von Tratzberg. They had the following children:
 Sibylla Freiin Fugger (1572–1616)
 Hieronymus Freiherr Fugger (1574–1579)
 Katharina Freiin Fugger (1575–1607)
 Georg Graf Fugger, Landvogt in Schwaben (1577–1643)
 Veronika Gräfin Fugger (1578–1645)
 Regina Gräfin Fugger (1581–1633)
 Anna Gräfin Fugger (1582–1633)
 Johann Fugger the Elder, Herr zu Babenhausen (1583–1633)
 Hieronymus Graf Fugger, Herr zu Wellenburg (1584–1633)
 Maximilian Graf Fugger, Herr zu Boos (1587–1629)
 Jakob Freiherr Fugger (1588–1607)

References

Jakob III
1542 births
1598 deaths
People from Unterallgäu